Expedición Robinson 2000, was the first season of the Argentine version of the Swedish show Expedition Robinson and it aired 2000. This season took place on an island in Panama. During the pre-merge portion of the competition the North team initially proved to be the weaker team after losing the first two immunity challenges, however in the end the South team proved to be weaker as they lost the last four immunity challenges. Shortly after the merge the former North team members turned on each other, voting out three of their own. When it came time for the final four, the remaining contestants competed in two challenges to determine who would be the final two. Ultimately, Sebastián Martino who won this season over Adrián Miani by an unknown jury vote.

Next serie : Expedition Robinson 2001

Finishing order

Game Progress

Voting history

External links

Argentina
2000 Argentine television seasons
Argentine reality television series
2000s reality television series